Lacunoides is a genus of sea snails, marine gastropod mollusks in the family Neomphalidae.

Species
Species within the genus Lacunoides include:

 Lacunoides exquisitus Warén & Bouchet, 1989
 Lacunoides vitreus Warén & Bouchet, 2001

References

 Warén, A. & Bouchet, P. 1989. New gastropods from East Pacific hydrothermal vents.-Zool. Scr. 18: 67–102.

Neomphalidae